Sai Wan Ho is a station on the Hong Kong MTR . It was opened on 31 May 1985. It is located under Shau Kei Wan Road in Sai Wan Ho in the Eastern District.

History
The site of the present-day station concourse was home to the old Sai Wan Ho Market, operated by the Urban Council, which was demolished to make way for the MTR station. Construction commenced in May 1982. The station was built under two interfacing construction contracts. The 7.6-metre-diameter station tunnels (which contain the platforms) were built by Nishimatsu Construction, a Japanese contractor, under particularly difficult geological conditions. The off-street station concourse was constructed by a joint venture formed by Gammon Construction, Kier, and a now-defunct Scottish contractor called Lilley. The concourse was constructed within diaphragm walls from the top down, and was designed to support a new Urban Council complex and residential estate (called Felicity Garden) above it.

Sai Wan Ho station opened on 31 May 1985 as part of the first phase of the Island line.

Station layout
The platforms of Sai Wan Ho station are constructed in a stacked arrangement, with platform 2 above platform 1.

Entrances and exits
A: Tai On Street 
B: Shau Kei Wan Road

References

MTR stations on Hong Kong Island
Island line (MTR)
Sai Wan Ho
Railway stations in Hong Kong opened in 1985
1985 establishments in Hong Kong